The 1976 Giro d'Italia was the 59th edition of the Giro d'Italia, one of cycling's Grand Tours. The field consisted of 120 riders, and 86 riders finished the race.

By rider

By nationality

References

1976 Giro d'Italia
1976